Burton's vlei rat (Otomys burtoni) is a species of rodent in the family Muridae.
It is found only in Cameroon.
Its natural habitats are subtropical or tropical high-altitude shrubland, subtropical or tropical high-altitude grassland, and swamps.
It is threatened by habitat loss.

References

Endemic fauna of Cameroon
Otomys
Mammals described in 1918
Taxa named by Oldfield Thomas
Taxonomy articles created by Polbot